Standard languages of Mongolian are the following:

Standard Mongolian
 Mongolian as spoken in Mongolia which in praxi is based on the Khalkha dialect
 Standard Mongolian in China which is phonetically based on the Chakhar dialect and grammatically based on a mix of the grammar of various Inner Mongolian dialects with some written Mongolian influences

Standard Oirat Mongolian
 Kalmyk, a standard variety of Oirat Mongolian recognized in Kalmykia
 Oirat as still unofficially written in Clear script in Xinjiang which in praxi is based on the Torgut dialect

Standard Buryat Mongolian
 Buryat Mongolian based on the Khori dialect recognized in Buryatia